Anne Bayefsky is a lawyer, scholar and activist who currently directs the Touro College Institute on Human Rights and the Holocaust. She is a Fox News opinion writer, and an author and editor on several websites.

Career
Bayefsky holds a B.A., M.A. and LL.B. from the University of Toronto and an M.Litt. from Oxford University. She has served as the director of York's Centre for Refugee Studies, project director for the university's Human Rights Treaty Study, member of Canadian delegations to international meetings, such as the UN Human Rights Commissions in 1993–1996, the UN General Assembly in 1984 and 1989, the Vienna World Conference on Human Rights in 1993, and a delegate of the American Society of International Law to the Beijing Fourth World Conference on Women in 1995. She has previously been a Senior Fellow at the Hudson Institute, an American conservative think tank.

Currently, she is director of the Touro College Institute on Human Rights, the senior editor and a board member for the 'Human Rights Voices' online news platform, and an author at 'Eye on the UN', which is run by the Hudson Institute and the Touro College Institute for Human Rights.  She also sits on the Board of Advisors of the Jewish Institute for National Security Affairs, a non-profit thinktank focusing on issues of United States and Israel's national security. Her legal expertise is in international, human rights, women's rights, and United Nations law, and covers four decades, beginning at the University of Ottawa in 1981.

In 2018, the pro-Israel non-profit Committee for Accuracy in Middle East Reporting in America (CAMERA) compensated Bayefsky $280,000.00 for consultant work, according to a public federal filing.

Views
Bayefsky has argued that Ontario's policy of fully funding Roman Catholic schools, while denying full funding to other religious schools, is discriminatory.

Bayefsky speaks out in defense of Israel. She was critical of "the Obama administration's response to Israel's announcement that it will continue to build new homes for its expanding population in disputed territory," calling it "hysterical," and asked, "Given that the United States is supposed to be committed to the parties determining ultimate legal ownership of the land in final status negotiations, what is going on?"

Awards
1992: Recipient of the Bora Laskin National Fellowship in Human Rights Research from the Social Sciences and Humanities Research Council of Canada.
2002–2004: Lady Davis Fellow at the Hebrew University in Jerusalem
1995–1996: Recipient of a MacArthur Foundation grant in Peace and International Cooperation

Publications
The UN Human Rights Treaty System: Universality at the Crossroads, Transnational Publishers, (softbound), c. 2001; Kluwer Law International (hardbound), c. 2001;
The UN Human Rights Treaty System in the Twenty-First Century, Kluwer Law International, c. 2000; (co-ed.)
The UN and the Jews, Commentary Magazine, February 1, 2004.
Human Rights and Forced Displacement, Martinus Nijhoff Publishers, c. 2000; (ed.)
Self-Determination in International Law: Quebec and Lessons Learned, Kluwer Law International, c. 2000;
International Human Rights Law: Use in Canadian Charter of Rights and Freedoms Litigation, Butterworths, c. 1992;
Canada's Constitution Act 1982 and Amendments: A Documentary History, Volume I and II, McGraw-Hill Ryerson, c. 1989; (ed.)
Legal Theory Meets Legal Practice, Academic Printing and Publishing, c. 1988; (co-ed.)
Equality Rights and the Canadian Charter of Rights and Freedoms, Carswell Co. Ltd., c. 1985.

See also
Israel and the United Nations
Modern anti-Semitism

References

External links
Bayefsky.com, The United Nations Human Rights Treaties
Bio of Bayefsky at the Hudson Institute 
Bio of Bayefsky at Eye on the UN
Human Rights Watch Coverup from NGO Monitor
Bio of Bayefsky at the Jewish Institute for National Security Affairs

Canadian human rights activists
Women human rights activists
Canadian legal scholars
Canadian Zionists
Canadian Jews
University of Toronto alumni
Living people
Activists from Toronto
Alumni of the University of Oxford
Touro College people
Critics of the United Nations
Canadian women activists
Women legal scholars
Year of birth missing (living people)
Place of birth missing (living people)
Jewish women activists
Jewish human rights activists
21st-century Canadian Jews